Fighter Squadron Composite 13 (VFC-13), also known as the "Fighting Saints", is a fighter squadron of the United States Navy Reserve that provides adversary training at NAS Fallon, Nevada. VFC-13 uses "Bogey" as its main radio callsign.

Mission
VFC-13 provides adversary training for Navy and Marine Corps Active and Reserve fleet and replacement squadrons, carrier air wings and Marine aircraft groups, USAF units, to include Air Force Reserve and Air National Guard, and Canadian Forces. The squadron has received two consecutive CNO Safety Awards, the Golden Wrench Maintenance Award, and in 1994 and 2011, the Battle "E" award.

History

1970s
The squadron was established as Fleet Composite Squadron Thirteen (VC-13) on 1 September 1973 at NAS New Orleans, Louisiana when the US Navy reorganized the US Naval Reserve and the Naval Air Reserve Force (NAVAIRESFOR). The squadron first flew the F-8 Crusader, and had 17 officers and 127 enlisted men within its ranks, most were former members of VSF-76 and VSF-86. In April 1974, they made the transition to the A-4 Skyhawk. The demand for West Coast adversary squadrons and other fleet support missions resulted in the  squadron relocating to NAS Miramar, California in February 1976. In mid-1976, VC-13 added the two seat TA-4J to the single seat A-4L in their aircraft complement.

1980s
In 1983, the squadron returned to single-seat aircraft and transitioned to the A-4E.

On 22 April 1988, the squadron was re-designated Fighter Composite Squadron Thirteen (VFC-13). The same year, the squadron started operating A-4F "Super Fox" variant of the A-4.

1990s

On 26 August 1993, the last A-4 left the squadron. Starting in September, the squadron transitioned to the F/A-18 Hornet.

In April 1996, VFC-13 transferred to NAS Fallon and made the transition to the F-5E Tiger II. It took over the adversary mission from VFA-45 and VFA-127.

2010s

In 2011, the squadron received their second Battle "E" Efficiency Award.

2020s
In April 2022, plans to replace VFC-13's F-5s with Block 32 F-16 Fighting Falcons which are being retired from USAF service became public. The squadron's F-5s will be transferred to VFA-204, a US Navy adversary squadron currently operating F/A-18 Hornets. VFA-204, based at Naval Air Station Joint Reserve Base New Orleans, is scheduled to retire its aging fleet of Hornets and will be redesignated VFC-204 by October 2022.

 the squadron has transitioned to the F-16C.

See also
History of the United States Navy
List of United States Navy aircraft squadrons
List of inactive United States Navy aircraft squadrons

References

External links
Naval Air Station Fallon

Fleet fighter composite squadrons of the United States Navy